Richard Meredith (sometimes Meredyth) (died 3 August 1597) was the Church of Ireland Bishop of Leighlin from 1589 until his death.

Life
Meredith, descended from Gruffudd ap Cynan, was from Denbighshire, Wales. He was the son of Robert Meredith of Llanfair Talhaiarn and the nephew of George Smith, Chancellor of St. Asaph. He was educated at the University of Oxford, matriculating in 1568 and obtained degrees of Bachelor of Arts and Master of Arts in 1573 and 1575 respectively from Jesus College, Oxford. In 1578, he was prebendary at Brecon collegiate church and the rector of Barton, Pembrokeshire; in the following year, he became vicar of his native Llanafan Fawr in Brecknockshire and in 1580 the rector of Nangle, Pembrokeshire, and prebendary of St David's Cathedral, where his father's first cousin, Richard Davies, was bishop.

In the same year as his marriage he was appointed chaplain to Sir John Perrot, Lord Deputy of Ireland and Dean of St Patrick's Cathedral, Dublin. He was appointed Bishop of Leighlin in 1589 (but not also, as is sometimes thought, Bishop of Ferns; the two sees not being merged until after his death). Meredith continued as Dean of St Patrick's, given the poverty of his diocese. He was accused of treasonous correspondence once Perrot had returned to England in 1588, but Meredith showed the evidence to be forgeries. His support for Perrot led to his imprisonment in the Fleet Prison and an appearance before the Star Chamber, leading to a fine of £2,000 (later remitted in return for an annual payment to the queen of 300 marks for 10 years). He was in ill-health by 1593 and died in 1597; he was buried in St Patrick's.

Family and descendants
In 1584, he married Sarah Bathow (died 1650), who remarried Adam Loftus, 1st Viscount Loftus after his death. Their elder son, Robert Meredyth (1585–1668) M.P., was  Chancellor of the Irish Exchequer and married (1st) Anne Ussher, daughter of Sir William Ussher Knight and his first wife Isabella Loftus, daughter of Adam Loftus, Archbishop of Dublin. 

Bishop Richard and his wife Isabella were ancestors of the Meredyth baronets, of Greenhills and Shrowland, Co. Kildare. Their younger son, Sir Thomas Meredith (died 1677), was the Member of Parliament for Old Leighlin, Co. Carlow, and ancestor of the Baronets of Dollardstown, Newtown and Carlandstown, Co. Meath. A large monument in black and White marble stands in the North Transept of St. Patrick's Cathedral to Bishop Meredith.

References

Year of birth unknown
1597 deaths
Alumni of Jesus College, Oxford
16th-century Welsh Anglican priests
Burials at St Patrick's Cathedral, Dublin
16th-century Anglican bishops in Ireland
16th-century Welsh clergy
Welsh emigrants to Ireland
Bishops of Leighlin
Richard